Hagemann is a surname. Notable people with the surname include:

 Axel Otto Kristian Hagemann (1856–1907), Norwegian politician
 Carl Hagemann (1867–1940), German chemist, industrial manager and art collector
 Fredrik Hagemann (born 1929), Norwegian geologist and bureaucrat
 Gro Hagemann (born 1945), Norwegian historian
 Gustav Adolph Hagemann (1842–1916), Danish engineer and businessman
 Karen Hagemann (born 1955), German-American historian
 Kristian Kornelius Hagemann Brandt (1831–1905), Norwegian military officer and engineer
 Sara Hagemann (born 1979), Danish-born, London-based expert on the European Union
 Sonja Hagemann (1898–1983), Norwegian literary historian and literary critic
 Victoria Hagemann, Swiss Olympic fencer
 Wolf Hagemann (1898–1983), highly decorated Generalleutnant in the Wehrmacht during World War II

See also
 Hageman (disambiguation)